George Reade (October 25, 1608 – November 21, 1671) was a prominent landowner, military officer, judge, and politician who served as a member of the House of Burgesses and as Acting Governor of Virginia Colony. He is the great-great-grandfather of the first President of the United States, George Washington.

Early life and family 
Reade was born on October 25, 1608 in Linkenholt, Hampshire, England, the son of Sir Robert Reade and Mildred Windebank Reade. He descended from Magna Charta Sureties. His paternal grandparents were Andrew Reade and Alice Cooke, and his maternal grandparents were Frances Dymoke and Sir Thomas Windebank. His uncle was Sir Francis Windebank, Secretary of State to King Charles I. After his mother died, Reade traveled to Virginia in January 1637 at the age of 28 as a member of John Harvey's staff.

Marriage and children 
In 1641, Reade married Elizabeth Martiau, daughter of Nicolas Martiau. They were likely married in what is now known as Yorktown in York County, Virginia. They had seven children, including: 

 Mildred Reade (1643–1694), married Augustine Warner Jr.
 Robert Reade (1644–1722/23), married Mary Lilly
 George Reade Jr. (born ca. 1648)
 Francis Reade (1650–1694), married Jane Chisman
 Elizabeth Reade (1654–1717), married Capt. Thomas Cheesman
 Benjamin Reade (born ca. 1667), married Mary Gwynn
 Thomas Reade (birthdate unknown), married Lucy Gwynn

Career 
Reade settled first in a plantation home in Williamsburg, and later resided in York and Gloucester Counties. Reade acquired considerable land holdings throughout Virginia colony. He was granted 600 acres of land in Lancaster County in 1651, 500 acres in Northumberland County in 1653, 2,000 acres in Westmoreland County in 1657, and 2,000 acres of land along the Piankatank River by the General Assembly in 1667. Reade served in the Virginia Militia beginning in the late 1630s, achieving the ranks of Captain, Major, and Colonel.

Virginia political career 
After Charles I restored John Harvey to the post of Governor of Virginia in 1636, Reade joined him as a member of his party to return to Virginia. Reade worked as an advisor to Harvey and resided at the governor's mansion for a period. From 1638 to 1639, Reade served in the post of Acting Governor of Virginia during Harvey's absence, and until Sir Francis Wyatt was appointed to succeed Harvey. Reade worked closely with Richard Kemp who was the Secretary of the Virginia Colony, and he assumed the post in an acting capacity during Kemp's absence from 1640 until 1642. 

From 1649 until 1656, Reade served as a member of the House of Burgesses representing James City County. Reade served as a member of the Virginia Governor's Council from around 1656 until his death. On August 25, 1656, Reade was a justice of the General Court of Virginia, sitting for York County.

Death 
Reade died in 1671 at the age of 63. He is buried at the Grace Episcopal Churchyard in Yorktown.

Notable descendants 

 George Washington (1732–1799) – General of the American Revolutionary War, first American President; 2rd great-grandson
 Thomas Nelson Jr. (1738–1789) – Brigadier General, Signer of the Declaration of Independence, Governor of Virginia; 2nd great-grandson 
 Meriwether Lewis (1774–1809) – American explorer, Governor of Louisiana Territory; 3rd great-grandson
 George S. Patton (1885-1945) – General of the United States Army during World War II; 7th and 8th great-grandson
 Queen Elizabeth II (1926-2022) – Queen of the United Kingdom; 9th great-granddaughter

See also 

 Colony of Virginia
 Virginia History
 List of colonial governors of Virginia

References 

Colonial governors of Virginia
1608 births
1671 deaths
English emigrants